Horsfiline is an oxindole alkaloid found in the plant Horsfieldia superba, which is used in traditional herbal medicine. It has analgesic effects and has been the subject of research both to produce it synthetically by convenient routes and to develop analogues and derivatives which may have improved analgesic effects.

It is a member of the spiroindolone class.  Elacomine has a similar chemical structure.

References 

Phenol ethers
Lactams
Oxindoles
Pyrrolidine alkaloids
Spiro compounds